Psednos is a genus of snailfishes found in all the world's oceans.

Species
There are currently 34 recognized species in this genus:
 Psednos andriashevi Chernova, 2001 (Andriashev's dwarf snailfish)
 Psednos anoderkes Chernova & Stein, 2002
 Psednos argyrogaster Stein, 2012
 Psednos balushkini Stein, Chernova & Andriashev, 2001 (Palemouth snailfish)
 Psednos barnardi Chernova, 2001 (Blackchin dwarf snailfish)
 Psednos carolinae Stein, 2005
 Psednos cathetostomus Chernova & Stein, 2002
 Psednos chathami Stein, 2012
 Psednos christinae Andriashev, 1992 (European dwarf snailfish)
 Psednos cryptocaeca Stein, 2012
 Psednos delawarei Chernova & Stein, 2002
 Psednos dentatus Chernova & Stein, 2002
 Psednos gelatinosus Chernova, 2001 (Gelatinous dwarf snailfish)
 Psednos griseus Chernova & Stein, 2002
 Psednos groenlandicus Chernova, 2001 (Greenland dwarf snailfish)
 Psednos harteli Chernova, 2001 (Hartel's dwarf snailfish)
 Psednos islandicus Chernova & Stein, 2002
 Psednos longiventris Stein, 2012
 Psednos melanocephalus Chernova & Stein, 2002
 Psednos mexicanus Chernova & Stein, 2002
 Psednos microps Chernova, 2001 (Smalleye dwarf snailfish)
 Psednos microstomus Stein, 2012
 Psednos micruroides Chernova, 2001 (Multipore dwarf snailfish)
 Psednos micrurus Barnard, 1927 (Barnard's dwarf snailfish)
 Psednos mirabilis Chernova, 2001 (Marvelous dwarf snailfish)
 Psednos nataliae Stein & Andriashev, 2001 (Darkgill snailfish)
 Psednos nemnezi Stein, 2012
 Psednos pallidus Chernova & Stein, 2002
 Psednos platyoperculosus Stein, 2012
 Psednos sargassicus Chernova, 2001 (Sargasso dwarf snailfish)
 Psednos spirohira Chernova & Stein, 2002
 Psednos steini Chernova, 2001 (Stein's dwarf snailfish)
 Psednos struthersi Stein, 2012
 Psednos whitleyi Stein, Chernova & Andriashev, 2001 (Bigcheek snailfish)

References

Liparidae